The Epsom Downs Branch is a railway line in the United Kingdom. The line starts at Sutton in the London Borough of Sutton. It is double track for about  until it reaches the approach to Belmont where it becomes single track. The line continues from Belmont through Banstead and terminates at Epsom Downs in Surrey. The "Downs" referred to in the name are part of the North Downs.

The line opened in 1865.

History

Racecourse developed
Racing horses at Epsom was probably founded about 1630, and over time it became phenomenally popular among all classes of society. Londoners and others visited on important race days in huge numbers. When the London and Southampton Railway opened the first part of its line in May 1838, it was suddenly possible to travel about half of the way from London to Epsom by train, and 5,000 people presented themselves at Nine Elms, then the L&SR's London terminus, intending to do so. Naturally they overwhelmed the resources of the railway company at this early date.

Railway branch to connect
The London, Brighton and South Coast Railway opened a line as far as Epsom on 10 May 1847, timed for Derby Day that year. In 1859 the London and South Western Railway (LSWR, and successor to the L&SR) opened its own line from London to a separate station at Epsom. The racecourse was a mile or so from the stations, and with two railways providing access, there seemed still to be unmet demand. So lucrative was the business that some local interested parties got together and projected the Banstead and Epsom Downs Railway. They were granted Parliamentary authorisation to build their line by Act of 17 July 1862; the line was to be  miles long.

Their line would make a junction with the LBSCR at Sutton, on the Croydon and Epsom line, and the LBSCR had already indicated provisional support. It was necessary to finalise arrangements for the junction connection, and for working arrangements. This was undertaken, but letting the contract for construction proved more contentious. The directors were apparently inexperienced in working together as a board, and there were angry resignations. A number of agreements with contractors were made improperly. In addition, the Company was now served with writs by some of the expelled directors.

The negotiations with the LBSCR had reached a stage where the LBSCR insisted that the Banstead company extend its line nearer to the grandstand of the racecourse. This proved to be impossible, as transfer of the necessary land was refused. The company was in extreme difficulty, and the way out presented itself when the LBSCR offered to take it over; in June 1864 that was put into effect. It was authorised under an LBSCR general powers Act of 29 July 1864. That resolved the inefficiency of the direction, and the line opened from Sutton to Epsom Downs on 22 May 1865. During Epsom week immediately following about 70,000 persons were conveyed by the railway.

The branch was built as a double track line in view of the surges of traffic expected; at Sutton, the main line junction, the Epsom Downs line had its own separate platforms. stations on the line were California, Banstead and Epsom Downs. California station was named after a public house, owned by a man who had returned from the gold rush with some money. Due to confusion on the part of goods consignors, it was renamed Belmont, but the public house continues (2022) in business under the original name. Epsom Downs station had nine platforms from the outset. California station was opened on 22 May 1865 and renamed Belmont on 2 October 1875; Banstead station was opened on 22 May 1865; it was renamed Banstead & Burgh Heath form 1 June 1898, and reverted to plain Banstead in August 1928. Epsom Downs station opened on 22 May 1865; it was resited 300 yards towards Sutton, first used by trains in the evening of 13 February 1989.

Usage

Although the Epsom Downs station had lavish facilities, outside of race days it was all but deserted. In 1892 the site of the terminus was described as "an absolute wilderness and the most god-forsaken place in the world" through which it was alleged only 20-30 passengers passed on a normal day.

The net revenue on the branch was not great, particularly considering the abstraction of business from the LBSCR's own Epsom station. Many racegoers continued to favour the traditional approach from Epsom town, where there was overnight accommodation and numerous refreshment opportunities. Moreover attendances at the Summer Meeting were falling towards the end of the 19th century. In the 1890s, when the motor car was still a rare sight, the surplus over working expenses on the branch taken over the year as a whole, including race days, barely exceeded £200. Nevertheless the LBSCR invested in improved signalling for better line capacity on race days: a new signal box was opened at Epsom Downs in May 1879 and intermediate boxes (designated A, B and C) for use on race days only were provided between Sutton and Belmont, Belmont and Banstead and between Banstead and the terminus in 1901-1902.

The twentieth century

Rail motors
From October 1909 the passenger service on the branch was entirely operated by rail motors. As residential development increased, the train service gradually increased in step, and by June 1914 there were 41 trips daily. Some ordinary locomotive-worked trains were now included in the mix. After World War I the LBSCR restored pre-war levels of service and by October 1923, under the Southern Railway, 49 trips were made.

Grouping of the railways
In 1923 most of the railways of Great Britain were reorganised following the Railways Act 1921: four new large companies were formed, and the LBSCR was a constituent, with others, of the new Southern Railway.

Electrification
The West Croydon to Sutton line was electrified on the LBSCR overhead system from 1 April 1925; the Epsom Downs branch was not included in the project, but the overhead system was installed in the Down Branch platform at Sutton as far as one train length beyond the country-end crossover, for terminating trains.

From 17 June 1928 the third rail system of electrification was installed on a widespread network of the former LBSCR suburban system, including the Epsom Downs branch.

Rationalisation
In step with the reduction of train travel to the racecourse, reduction of the spacious layout at Epsom Downs began in the early 1950s: the number of electrified platform tracks was reduced to five. From 1 May 1972 only two platforms remained in use. 

There was a fire on 16 November 1981 which effectively destroyed Epsom Downs signalbox. From October 1982 the branch was singled, and trains used the former Down platform at Banstead. The singling was an emergency arrangement, as the Victoria resignalling scheme was in progress. It was completed and full signalling was in place, still on the basis of a single line on the branch line, in June 1983.

Future

Belmont railway station is the closest station to the Royal Marsden Hospital, which is just under half a mile away. On 19 January 2023, Sutton Council were granted £14,121,979 from the government to add a turnback siding to the south of the station to increase capacity to let services run at 4 tph instead of the current 2 tph service pattern between Sutton and Belmont, the section between Belmont and Epsom Downs will keep it's 2tph service patten.

Services
There are four stops on the line: 
Sutton - zone 5
Belmont - zone 5
Banstead - zone 6
Epsom Downs - zone 6

All services on the line are currently operated by Southern, and form part of the Sutton & Mole Valley Line services. From January 2006 all stations are included in the Transport for London zonal pricing scheme, including those beyond the Greater London boundary.

From May 2018, the typical off-peak service calls at all stations on the line every 30 minutes from London Victoria via  and Norbury.  A historic step change has been delivered to services on this line and there are now two trains an hour from Epsom Downs to London Victoria via Sutton and West Croydon on Sundays.

Notes

References

External links

The Epsom Downs Branch Website (unofficial)

Rail transport in Surrey
Transport in the London Borough of Sutton
Transport in Epsom and Ewell
Railway lines opened in 1865
Railway lines in London
Railway lines in South East England
Standard gauge railways in England